Dunderland is a village in the Dunderland Valley in the municipality of Rana in Nordland county, Norway.

The village has a train station, Dunderland Station, on the Nordland Line, between the villages of Skonseng and Lønsdal.

References

Villages in Nordland
Rana, Norway